The 1945 Chicago Cardinals season was the 26th season the team was in the league. The team improved on their previous output of 0–10, winning one game, and snapping an NFL record 29-game losing streak (dating back to 1942, and including their season as Card-Pitt) in the process.  They failed to qualify for the playoffs for the 20th consecutive season. The Cardinals had to play seven consecutive games on the road (albeit one was in Chicago, against the Bears) and they were shut out in four of their ten games.

Schedule

Standings

References

Arizona Cardinals seasons
Chicago Cardinals
Chicago Card